Juan Luis Sánchez Velasco (born 15 August 2003), commonly known as Juanlu, is a Spanish footballer who plays as a right winger for CD Mirandés, on loan from Sevilla FC.

Club career
Born in Seville, Andalusia, Juanlu began his career with CD Los Caminantes at the age of six. In the following year, he moved to CD San Alberto Magno, and joined Sevilla FC's youth setup in 2015, aged 12. On 13 August 2019, after finishing his formation, he signed his first professional contract with the latter club, and was subsequently promoted to the reserves in the Segunda División B.

Juanlu made his senior debut at the age of 16 on 24 August 2019, starting in a 0–0 home draw against Yeclano Deportivo. He scored his first senior goal on 18 November of the following year, netting the B's second in a 2–2 draw at Club Recreativo Granada.

Juanlu made his first-team debut on 15 December 2021, starting in a 1–1 away draw (6–5 penalty win) against CE Andratx in the season's Copa del Rey. His La Liga debut occurred six days later, as he came on as a late substitute for Papu Gómez in a 1–1 home draw against FC Barcelona.

On 8 August 2022, Juanlu joined Segunda División club Mirandés on a season-long loan.

International career
Juanlu represented Spain at under-16, under-17, under-18 and under-19 levels.

References

External links
 
 
 

2003 births
Living people
Footballers from Seville
Spanish footballers
Association football wingers
La Liga players
Primera Federación players
Segunda División B players
Sevilla Atlético players
Sevilla FC players
CD Mirandés footballers
Spain youth international footballers